Castellana may refer to:

Places
 La Castellana (TransMilenio), a bus rapid transit station in Bogota, Colombia
 Castellana Grotte, a town in the province of Bari, Italy
 Castellana Caves, a cave system in the municipality
 Castellana Sicula, a town in the province of Palermo, Italy.
 Civita Castellana, a town in the province of Viterbo, 65 km north of Rome, Italy
 La Castellana, Negros Occidental, a town in the province of Negros Occidental, Philippines
 Castellana (Madrid), a ward in the Salamanca district of Madrid, Spain
 Paseo de la Castellana, the widest and longest street in Madrid, Spain
 La Castellana (Caracas), a neighbourhood in Caracas, Venezuela

Other meanings
 Anís La Castellana, a Spanish brand of anise liquor
 Castellana (Agkistrodon howardgloydi), a venomous pitviper subspecies found in Honduras, Nicaragua and Costa Rica
 A.C. Castellana Calcio, Associazione Calcistica Castellana Calcio is an Italian association football club

See also
 Castellan, the governor or captain of a castellany and its castle
 Castellania (disambiguation)